Sōsuke, Sosuke or Sousuke (written: 宗佑, 宗輔, 宗助, 壮祐, 壮介, 壮亮, 荘介, 蒼甫, 創介, そうすけ, or ソウスケ) is a masculine Japanese given name. Notable people with the name include:

, Japanese professional baseball player
, Japanese swordsman
, Japanese actor
, Japanese manga artist
, Japanese playwright
, Japanese footballer
, Japanese announcer
, Japanese former actor
, Japanese fencer
, Japanese politician and Prime Minister of Japan

Fictional characters
, a character in the manga series Bleach
, protagonist of the tokusatsu series Engine Sentai Go-onger
, a character in the manga series Toilet-Bound Hanako-kun
, protagonist of the light novel series Full Metal Panic!
, a character in the anime series Free! Eternal Summer
, one of the protagonists of the anime film Ponyo
, a character from the Assassination Classroom manga and anime series

See also 
 Sasuke (disambiguation)

Japanese masculine given names